Moaz El-Henawy (born 29 January 1990) is an Egyptian footballer. He currently plays as a defender for the Egyptian Premier League club Aswan SC. Moaz was the Egypt U-20 national team captain in the 2009 FIFA U-20 World Cup in Egypt. In January 2012, El-Henawy suffered a large leg injury that would keep him out for many months therefore preventing him to take part with the Egypt U-23 team in the 2012 Summer Olympics in London.

References

1990 births
Living people
Egyptian footballers
Egypt international footballers
Association football defenders
Al Ahly SC players
Egyptian Premier League players